Obolopteryx emarginata (synonym Dichopetala emarginata), the spoon-tail short-wing katydid, is the type species of phaneropterine katydids of its genus and in the family Tettigoniidae. It is found in North America.

References

Further reading

 
 
 

Phaneropterinae
Articles created by Qbugbot
Insects described in 1878